

572001–572100 

|-bgcolor=#f2f2f2
| colspan=4 align=center | 
|}

572101–572200 

|-bgcolor=#f2f2f2
| colspan=4 align=center | 
|}

572201–572300 

|-id=217
| 572217 Dramba || || Constantin Dramba (1907–1977) was a Romanian astronomer || 
|}

572301–572400 

|-bgcolor=#f2f2f2
| colspan=4 align=center | 
|}

572401–572500 

|-bgcolor=#f2f2f2
| colspan=4 align=center | 
|}

572501–572600 

|-bgcolor=#f2f2f2
| colspan=4 align=center | 
|}

572601–572700 

|-bgcolor=#f2f2f2
| colspan=4 align=center | 
|}

572701–572800 

|-bgcolor=#f2f2f2
| colspan=4 align=center | 
|}

572801–572900 

|-bgcolor=#f2f2f2
| colspan=4 align=center | 
|}

572901–573000 

|-bgcolor=#f2f2f2
| colspan=4 align=center | 
|}

References 

572001-573000